The fourteenth season of Criminal Minds was ordered on May 12, 2018, by CBS with an order of 15 episodes. The season premiered on October 3, 2018 and concluded on February 6, 2019. The season also featured the milestone 300th episode, which served as the season premiere.

Cast
The entire main cast from the previous season returned.

Main cast 

 Joe Mantegna as Supervisory Special Agent David Rossi (BAU Senior Agent)
 Matthew Gray Gubler as Supervisory Special Agent Dr. Spencer Reid (BAU Agent)
 A. J. Cook as Supervisory Special Agent Jennifer "JJ" Jareau (BAU Agent)
 Kirsten Vangsness as Special Agent Penelope Garcia (BAU Technical Analyst & Co-Communications Liaison)
 Aisha Tyler as Supervisory Special Agent Dr. Tara Lewis (BAU Agent)
 Daniel Henney as Supervisory Special Agent Matt Simmons (BAU Agent)
 Adam Rodriguez as Supervisory Special Agent Luke Alvez (BAU Agent)
 Paget Brewster as Supervisory Special Agent Emily Prentiss (BAU Unit Chief & Co-Communications Liaison)

Recurring cast
 Gail O'Grady as Krystall Richards
 Danielle C. Ryan as Portia Richards
 Kelly Frye as Kristy Simmons
 Declan Whaley as David Simmons
 Josh Stewart as William LaMontagne Jr.
 Mekhai Andersen as Henry LaMontagne
 Daniella Alonso as Lisa Douglas
 Stephen Bishop as Andrew Mendoza

Guest cast
 James Urbaniak as FBI Special Agent Owen Quinn
 Karen David as FBI Special Agent Mary Meadows
 Michael Hogan as Benjamin David Merva
 Sebastian Sozzi as Carlos Garcia
 Corey Reynolds as Former FBI Fugitive task force Agent Phil Brooks
 Gale Harold as Dr. Daryl Wright
 Candy Clark as Sandy Jareau
 Michael Mosley as Everett Lynch
 Sharon Lawrence as Roberta Lynch
 Alex Jennings as Grace Lynch
 Amber Stevens West as Joy Struthers
 Johnny Mathis as himself

Production

Development
Criminal Minds was renewed for a fourteenth season with an episode order of 15 episodes on May 12, 2018, with the possibility of more episodes being ordered later in the season. On November 27, 2018, it was reported that CBS had declined to order any more episodes for the season.

On June 25, 2018, it was revealed that Matthew Gray Gubler, Joe Mantegna, Aisha Tyler and Adam Rodriguez would direct episodes this season and that A.J. Cook would make her directorial debut and direct an episode this season.

On September 21, 2018, it was revealed that Kirsten Vangsness and showrunner Erica Messer would be co-writing the fifteenth episode of the season, which also served as the season finale. This would have been the fifth episode they have co-written together. On December 6, 2018, it was revealed Messer and Vangsness would no longer be co-writing the episode and that Erica Meredith would be doing so instead.

Casting
On October 19, 2018, it was announced that Stephen Bishop had been cast in a recurring role as SSA Andrew Mendoza, who is a love interest for Emily Prentiss.

Episodes

Ratings

References

External links
 

Criminal Minds
2018 American television seasons
2019 American television seasons